A penumbral lunar eclipse took place on Thursday, July 6, 1944.

Visibility

Related lunar eclipses

Lunar year series

See also
List of lunar eclipses
List of 20th-century lunar eclipses

Notes

External links

1944-07
1944 in science